Comparison is the act of examining the similarities and differences between things. Comparison may also refer to:

Computer science and technology
 Comparison (computer programming), a code that makes decisions and selects alternatives based on them
 Comparison microscope, a dual microscope for analyzing side-by-side specimens
 Comparison sort, a type of data sort algorithm
 File comparison, the automatic comparison of data such as files and texts by computer programs
 Price comparison service, an Internet service

Language
 Comparison (grammar), the modification of adjectives and adverbs to express the relative degree
 Mass comparison, a test for the relatedness of languages

Mathematics
 Comparison (mathematics), a notation for comparing variable values
 Comparison of topologies, an order relation on the set of all topologies on one and the same set 
 Multiple comparisons, a procedure of statistics
 a synonym for co-transitivity, in constructive mathematics

Psychology
 Pairwise comparison, a test of psychology
 Social comparison theory, a branch of social psychology

Other uses
 Compare: A Journal of Comparative and International Education
 Cross-cultural studies, which involve cross-cultural comparisons

See also

 Comparability, a mathematical definition
 Comparative (disambiguation)
 Comparator (disambiguation)